Lazy Afternoon is the seventh studio album by American singer Regina Belle. It was released by Peak Records on July 13, 2004 in the United States. The album is a collection of jazz, soul and pop standards. It peaked at number 9 on the Billboard Top Contemporary Jazz chart and number 58 on the magazine's Top R&B/Hip-Hop Albums. Belle's rendition of the Isley Brothers song "For the Love of You" served as the album's lead single. "Fly Me to the Moon" and "If I Ruled the World" each received some airplay but did not chart.

Critical reception 

Allmusic editor Scott Yanow wrote that "what is particularly unusual about this set [...] is the repertoire. Over half of the songs are jazz standards, and it is a particular treat hearing Belle's soulful renditions [...] The music is not really jazz (although it hints at it), but the jazz tunes give Belle an opportunity to stretch both herself and the format a bit. George Duke is a major asset as both a producer and a keyboardist, Everette Harp takes a few tenor and alto solos, and The Perry Sisters contribute some powerful background vocals on half of the tracks."

Track listing 
All tracks were produced and arranged by George Duke.

Note
"For the Love of You" is also based on and performed in medley with "The Love I Lost" by Harold Melvin & the Blue Notes.

Personnel 
Credits adapted from the album's liner notes.

 Regina Belle – vocal arranger, lead vocals
 Alex Al – electric bass
 Diana Moreira Booker – spoken word voices 
 Oscar Brashear – flugelhorn, trumpet
 Gordon Campbell – drums
 Lenny Castro – percussion, tambourine 
 Corine Duke – production coordinator
 George Duke – producer, arranger, organ, fender rhodes, wurlitzer, acoustic piano, keyboards
 Ray Fuller – electric guitar
 Everette Harp – alto saxophone solo, tenor saxophone solo 
 Christian McBride – electric bass, upright bass
 Dean Parks – electric guitar, acoustic guitar
 Darlene Perry – background vocals
 Lori Perry – background vocals 
 Sharon Perry – background vocals, coloratura 
 Erik Zobler – audio engineer, audio mixing

Charts

References 

2004 albums
Regina Belle albums
Covers albums